Dastjerd (also Romanized as Dastgerd and Dast-i-Gird) is a village in Beyarjomand Rural District, Beyarjomand District, Shahrud County, Semnan Province, Iran. At the 2006 census, its population was 409, in 153 families.

References 

Populated places in Shahrud County